Firmin Ngrébada (born 1968) is the former prime minister of the Central African Republic. He was appointed after a peace deal was signed between the government and 14 armed groups to try to suppress violence in the ongoing civil war. He also led the Central African Republic's delegation in the negotiations of the peace deal.

Political career 
Firmin Ngrebada graduated in law, in 1988, then he obtained a Master's degree in Public Law, in 1994, at the University of Bangui. He entered public service in October 1993, inspecting social and labor law.

Ngrébada served as Deputy Cabinet Director under Simplice Sarandji when Sarandji was Cabinet Director and Faustin-Archange Touadéra was Prime Minister. He went on to become the cabinet director of the Central African Republic, and chief of staff to the President. On February 25 2019, Ngrébada was sworn in as Prime Minister.

On 10 June 2021 Ngrébada and his entire cabinet resigned following the withdrawal of 160 French soldiers from the country earlier that week.

References 

Living people
1968 births
Prime Ministers of the Central African Republic
People from Bangui
Date of birth missing (living people)
University of Bangui alumni